Bhushan is a male Indian given name.  It may refer to:

People 
Ardhendu Bhushan Bardhan (1924–2016), general secretary of the Communist Party of India
Amita Bhushan (born 1970), Indian politician
Bharat Bhushan (1920–1992), prominent actor of the 1950s and 1960s in Bollywood
Bhushan Kumar (born 1977), Indian film producer
Bhushan Lal Karihaloo (born 1943), professor of civil, architectural, and environmental engineering
Bhushan Tiwari, Indian film actor in Hindi films
Brij Bhushan Sharan Singh  (born 1957), Indian politician
Brij Bhushan Tiwari (1941–2012), Indian Samajwadi Party politician
Chandra Bhushan Singh (born 1944), Indian politician
Kavi Bhushan, 17th century Indian poet
Prashant Bhushan, civil liberties lawyer of India
Shanti Bhushan (1925–2023), Indian politician, minister and senior advocate.
Yogiraj Bharat Bhushan (born 1952), yoga guru

See also 
Padma Bhushan award, an Indian civilian decoration established in 1954 by the President of India
Bhushan Steel, the largest manufacturer of auto-grade steel in India

Indian masculine given names